Aprixokogia is an extinct genus of cetacean in the family Kogiidae that lived during the Pliocene in what is now North Carolina.  It shared its habitat with ancestors of the modern pilot whale and pygmy right whale, as well as sea turtles and Pelagornis.

References

Sperm whales
Miocene cetaceans